Lian Hmung Sakhong is a Chin politician who served as a vice-chairman of Chin National Front (CNF) and of Union Peace Discussion Joint Committee (UPDJC).

He was appointed by the Committee Representing Pyidaungsu Hluttaw, with a mandate from the Chin Consultative Assembly, as the minister of federal union affairs in the National Unity Government on 16 April 2021.

References

Burmese politicians
Living people
Year of birth missing (living people)
People from Chin State
Burmese people of Chin descent
21st-century Burmese politicians